"1959" is a rock song written by Patti Smith and Tony Shanahan, and released as a promo single from Patti Smith 1997 album Peace and Noise. At the 40th Annual Grammy Awards the song was nominated for Grammy Award for Best Female Rock Vocal Performance.

Notes

External links 
 Full length version of the song at Arista Records

1997 singles
Patti Smith songs
Songs written by Patti Smith
1997 songs
Arista Records singles